Aphycita is a monotypic snout moth genus described by Hans Georg Amsel in 1968. It contains the species A. sindella, described by the same author. It is found in Pakistan.

References

Phycitinae
Monotypic moth genera
Moths of Asia
Taxa named by Hans Georg Amsel
Pyralidae genera